Ngoun Chhay Kry is the former minister for public works and telecommunications of Cambodia.

References

Living people
Year of birth missing (living people)
Cambodian politicians
Government ministers of Cambodia